Manar, sometimes Al Manar (with the Arabic definite article "al-"), may refer to:

Manar

People
Andy Manar (born 1975), Democratic member of the Illinois Senate
Houari Manar (1981–2019), Algerian raï singer

Places
Manar Dam, a dam on the Manar river near Kandhar, Maharashtra, India
Mannar Island (formerly Manar), an island in Sri Lanka
Mannar, Sri Lanka (formerly Manar), a town in Sri Lanka

Al Manar
Al-Manar, a Lebanese television station affiliated with Hezbollah
Al-Manar Football Festival, a football award ceremony organised by Al-Manar
Al-Manār (magazine), a defunct Egyptian Islamic magazine
Al-Manar Centre, a Salafi mosque in the Cathays district of Cardiff, Wales
Al Manar District, a district in the Dhamar Governorate, Yemen
Al Manar National School, a national school in Handessa, Sri Lanka
Al-Manar University of Tripoli, a university in Tripoli, Lebanon
Tunis El Manar University, a university in Tunis, Tunisia

Arabic-language surnames